The Georgi Rakovski Military Academy, based in Sofia, is Bulgaria's oldest military institution of higher education. It is named after Bulgarian revolutionary writer Georgi Sava Rakovski.

History
It was officially established on 1 March 1912 with an act of the National Assembly of Bulgaria and opened on 4 January 1915, delayed due to the Balkan Wars.

Since its creation, the academy has served as the main institution for the training of military commanders and personnel in Bulgaria and the primary one in the field of national security and military science, as well as NATO operational compatibility. The academy trains 1,500 officers and civil individuals a year and has 148 qualified lecturers. It is headed by Major-General Grudi Ivanov.

Alumni
Yordan Milanov (officer)

See also
 Vasil Levski National Military University

External links

 Official Website

Educational institutions established in 1912
Military academies of Bulgaria
Universities and colleges in Sofia
1912 establishments in Bulgaria